Fundătura may refer to several villages in Romania:

 Fundătura, a village in Motoșeni Commune, Bacău County
 Fundătura, a village in Iclod Commune, Cluj County
 Fundătura, a village in the town of Luduş, Mureș County
 Fundătura, a village in Arsura Commune, Vaslui County
 Fundătura, a village in Delești Commune, Vaslui County
 Fundătura, a village in Vlădești, Vâlcea
 Fundătura Mare and Fundătura Mică, villages in Ivănești Commune, Vaslui County
 Fundătura Răchitoasa, a village in Răchitoasa Commune, Bacău County
 Fundăturile, a village in Pătârlagele town, Buzău County

See also 
 Fundătura River (disambiguation)
 Fundeni (disambiguation)
 Fundoaia (disambiguation)
 Fundata